Yi Tang is a biochemist and professor in the Department of Chemistry and Biochemistry and the Department of Chemical and Biomolecular Engineering at the University of California, Los Angeles. His research interests include the discovery, functional characterization, and engineering of natural product biosynthetic enzymes. He was awarded the 2014 Eli Lilly Award in Biological Chemistry.

Education 
Tang attended college at Pennsylvania State University and earned his PhD in Chemistry in 2002 from the California Institute of Technology, where he worked in the lab of Professor David Tirrell.

Career and research 
From 2002 to 2004, Tang pursued postdoctoral studies at the Stanford University in the lab of Professor Chaitan Khosla. In 2004, Tang joined the faculty of the Department of Chemical and Biomolecular Engineering the University of California, Los Angeles. His group's research has focused on studying the biosynthesis of natural products from Streptomyces and filamentous fungi as well as engineering enzymes that can be used for the production of pharmaceutical compounds. One demonstration of the latter approach has been his group's development of a biocatalytic approach for making the commonly prescribed lipid-lowering medication simvastatin.

Web of Science lists 254 publications authored by Tang in peer-reviewed scientific journals that have been cited over 10,000 times, leading to an h-index of 58. His lab's three most cited papers have been cited >180 times each.

Awards and honors 

 2006 – National Science Foundation Career Award
 2006 – Presidential Early Career Award in Science and Engineering (PECASE)
 2008 – The Camille Dreyfus Teacher Scholar Award
 2009 – Sloan Research Fellowship
 2010 – Society for Industrial Microbiology (SIM) Young Investigator Award
 2012 – American Chemical Society Arthur C. Cope Scholar Award
 2012 – National Institute of Health Director’s  Pioneer Award (DP1)
 2014 – Eli Lilly Award in Biological Chemistry
 2015 – California Institute of Technology Chemical Engineering Robert W. Vaughan Lectureship

References 

Biochemists
University of California, Los Angeles faculty
Stanford University postdoctoral scholars
Pennsylvania State University alumni
California Institute of Technology alumni
Year of birth missing (living people)
Living people